Moghan (also Romanized as Moghān; also known as Mochān and Moqān) is a village in Torqabeh Rural District, Torqabeh District, Torqabeh and Shandiz County, Razavi Khorasan Province, Iran. At the 2006 census, its population was 828, in 258 families.

References 

Populated places in Torqabeh and Shandiz County